Enes Sipović (born 11 September 1990) is a Bosnian professional footballer who plays as a centre-back for Kuwaiti Division One club Al-Jahra SC.

Club career

Oțelul Galați
On 22 January 2009, At age of 18  Enes joined Oțelul Galați on three and half-year deal. He won the Romanian Liga I in the 2010–11 season with Oțelul Galați. 
During 2011–12 Enes Sipović was loaned out to FC Petrolul Ploiești on a season long loan deal. During 2012–13 Enes was loaned out to
FCV Farul Constanța

K.V.C. Westerlo
On 7 January 2015, Sipović joined Belgium club  K.V.C. Westerlo for the remainder of the season

Ittihad Tanger
On 14 July 2015, Sipović joined Moroccan Botola Pro league club Ittihad Tanger on a three-year contract.

RS Berkane
On 20 September 2017, Sipović joined another Moroccan club RS Berkane on a one-year deal. Enes went to make 37 appearances for club and Morocco.

Ohod Club 
On 17 July 2018, Sipović signed for the MS League outfit Ohod Club on a one-year deal. He played a total of 11 matches throughout the season, and left the club at the end of the season.

Željezničar Sarajevo 
On 6 February 2019, it was announced that Sipović had signed for Liga 12 side FK Željezničar Sarajevo on a one and a half-year deal. He scored his debut goal on 25 September 2019 against FK Zvijezda 09, which they won 6–0. After making a total of 11 appearances, he left the club in the winter-transfer window after reaching an agreement with Umm Salal SC.

Umm Salal 
On 27 December 2019, Sipović signed for the Qatar Stars League side Umm Salal SC on a two-year deal. He left the club for Chennaiyin FC after having represented the club 11 times during his time at the club.

Chennaiyin
On 21 September 2020, Sipović joined Indian Super League club  Chennaiyin on a one-year deal. He played 18 matches for Chennaiyin, and left the club for southern rivals Kerala Blasters FC.

Kerala Blasters
On 31 July 2021, Sipović joined Kerala Blasters on a one-year deal. He made his debut for the club on 11 September 2021 against Indian Navy in the 2021 Durand Cup after having named in squad for the tournament. He made his league debut in the 2021–22 Indian Super League season in the match against NorthEast United FC on 15 November, which ended in a 0–0 draw. He played in the 1–1 draw against SC East Bengal on 18 December, where he was substituted in the first half for Abdul Hakku after he was contracted with an injury. On 17 December, the club gave a statement that Sipović has sustained a grade one injury to his quadriceps muscle and would be out for two weeks for recovery. He returned to pitch in the match against Jamshedpur FC as a substitute in the 86th minute for Ruivah Hormipam on 26 December, which ended in a 1–1 draw. He scored his debut goal in the match against SC East Bengal on 14 February 2022, which they won 1–0 due to his thumping header.

International career
At international level, Sipović had represented Bosnia and Herzegovina under-21 team.

Personal life
Sipović is married to Nejra and together they have a son named Imran, born on 27 May 2022, named after Indian footballer Imran Khan of NorthEast United.

Career statistics 
As of matches played till 30 March 2022

Honours
Oțelul Galați
Liga I: 2010–11
Kerala Blasters

 Indian Super League runner up: 2021–22.

References

External links

Enes Sipović at Sofascore

1990 births
Living people
Footballers from Sarajevo
Association football central defenders
Bosnia and Herzegovina footballers
Bosnia and Herzegovina under-21 international footballers
ASC Oțelul Galați players
FC Petrolul Ploiești players
FCV Farul Constanța players
K.V.C. Westerlo players
Ittihad Tanger players
RS Berkane players
Ohod Club players
FK Željezničar Sarajevo players
Umm Salal SC players
Chennaiyin FC players
Liga I players
Belgian Pro League players
Botola players
Saudi Professional League players
Premier League of Bosnia and Herzegovina players
Qatar Stars League players
Indian Super League players
Kerala Blasters FC players
Bosnia and Herzegovina expatriate footballers
Expatriate footballers in Romania
Bosnia and Herzegovina expatriate sportspeople in Romania
Expatriate footballers in Belgium
Bosnia and Herzegovina expatriate sportspeople in Belgium
Expatriate footballers in Morocco
Bosnia and Herzegovina expatriate sportspeople in Morocco
Expatriate footballers in Saudi Arabia
Bosnia and Herzegovina expatriate sportspeople in Saudi Arabia
Expatriate footballers in Qatar
Bosnia and Herzegovina expatriate sportspeople in Qatar
Expatriate footballers in India
Bosnia and Herzegovina expatriate sportspeople in India